Sopwell House is a historic Georgian country house, now a luxury 128 bedroom hotel, country club & spa located south of  St Albans, Hertfordshire, England. It gained fame as the gathering place for the England national football team before international football events. It has also hosted other club and international football teams.  The facilities include a  conference & banqueting centre, 2 restaurants, 2 bars,  gym,  dance studio, and spa .

History
Though mention of buildings on the site goes back to 1604, it was not developed as a country house until the master mason Edward Strong built his home here in the 18th century. Strong's career included work on St Paul's Cathedral and Blenheim Palace.

During the mid-19th century Sopwell House known then as New Barnes (or New Barns) was the seat of the philanthropist Mrs. Isabella Worley. Amongst the many donations to St Albans from this benefactor were Christ Church on Verulam Road and the Wooden Room in Lattimore Road.

The house was extended in Victorian times and in 1900 was leased to Prince Louis of Battenberg, an Admiral of the Royal Navy who made it his family home. His 4 children grew up here, Alice Mountbatten, Louise Mountbatten, George Mountbatten and Louis Mountbatten. They all had notable lives.

The young Louis, like his father, had a distinguished Royal Navy career and was to become the last British Viceroy of India as Louis Mountbatten, 1st Earl Mountbatten of Burma. Alice married Prince Andrew of Greece and their son is Prince Philip, Duke of Edinburgh. The proposal of marriage was made in the grounds of the house. Louise Mountbatten went on to marry and become Queen of Sweden.

The home passed to the Verulam family after the Second World War and was sold to become a hotel in 1969.

Hotel
The hotel was bought by a family in 1986 and is still run as a family business today. It is part of the AB Hotels group consisting of 2 hotels in the South East of England (Sopwell House and Five Lakes Resort.

Other uses of the name 'Sopwell'
It should not be confused with an earlier 16th century Sopwell House, the ruins of which remain today along Cottonmill Lane near the centre of St Albans. This was built on the site of Sopwell Priory following the dissolution of the monasteries.

For the Georgian country house Sopwell Hall in North Tipperary, Ireland see Sopwell, North Tipperary

External links
 The Sopwell House Hotel website

Hotels in Hertfordshire
Country houses in Hertfordshire
Buildings and structures in St Albans
Grade II listed buildings in Hertfordshire
Country house hotels
Hotel spas